In geology, the Ukrainian Shield or the Ukrainian Crystalline Massif is the southwest shield of the East European craton. The Ukrainian Shield and the Voronezh Massif consist of 3.2-3.8 Ga Archaean crust in the southwest and east, and 2.3-2.1 Ga Early Proterozoic orogenic belts. The Ukrainian shield is approx. 1000 km long and up to 250 km wide.

External links
 Ukrainian Crystalline Shield at the Great Soviet Encyclopedia

Geology of Ukraine
Geomorphology